Kuzeyevo (Küźäy) is a rural locality (a village) in Shavyadinsky Selsoviet, Baltachevsky District, Bashkortostan, Russia. The population was 127 as of 2010. There are 3 streets.

Geography 
Kuzeyevo is located 7 km northwest of Starobaltachevo (the district's administrative centre) by road. Staroyaksheyevo is the nearest rural locality.

References 

Rural localities in Baltachevsky District